John Anscombe (4 January 1838 – 2 March 1881) was an English first-class cricketer who played for Sussex County Cricket Club.   His highest score of 2 came when playing for Sussex in the match against Kent County Cricket Club.

References

English cricketers
Sussex cricketers
1838 births
1881 deaths